Dallas Center is a city in Dallas County, Iowa, United States. The population was 1,901 during the 2020 census. It is part of the Des Moines–West Des Moines Metropolitan Statistical Area.

History
Dallas Center got its start in the year 1869, following construction of the railroad through the territory. It was named for United States Vice President George M. Dallas.

Dallas Center was incorporated on March 22, 1880.

Geography

Demographics

2010 census
As of the census of 2010, there were 1,623 people, 630 households, and 434 families residing in the city. The racial makeup of the city was 98.2% White, 0.6% African American, 0.2% Native American, 0.1% Asian, 0.1% from other races, and 0.8% from two or more races. Hispanic or Latino of any race were 0.7% of the population.

There were 630 households, of which 33.3% had children under the age of 18 living with them, 56.8% were married couples living together, 8.1% had a female householder with no husband present, 4.0% had a male householder with no wife present, and 31.1% were non-families. 27.3% of all households were made up of individuals, and 12.5% had someone living alone who was 65 years of age or older. The average household size was 2.48 and the average family size was 3.03.

The median age in the city was 40.1 years. 26.5% of residents were under the age of 18; 5.2% were between the ages of 18 and 24; 23.8% were from 25 to 44; 26.9% were from 45 to 64; and 17.7% were 65 years of age or older. The gender makeup of the city was 48.1% male and 51.9% female.

2000 census
As of the census of 2000, there were 1,595 people, 591 households, and 433 families residing in the city. The racial makeup of the city was 98.50% White, 0.31% African American, 0.25% Native American, 0.06% Asian, 0.69% from other races, and 0.19% from two or more races. Hispanic or Latino of any race were 0.63% of the population.

There were 591 households, out of which 37.2% had children under the age of 18 living with them, 64.8% were married couples living together, 6.8% had a female householder with no husband present, and 26.6% were non-families. 24.0% of all households were made up of individuals, and 11.0% had someone living alone who was 65 years of age or older. The average household size was 2.58 and the average family size was 3.07.

In the city, the population was spread out, with 26.1% under the age of 18, 6.4% from 18 to 24, 28.9% from 25 to 44, 20.8% from 45 to 64, and 17.7% who were 65 years of age or older. The median age was 39 years. For every 100 females, there were 94.3 males. For every 100 females age 18 and over, there were 89.1 males.

The median income for a household in the city was $52,883, and the median income for a family was $56,250. Males had a median income of $34,583 versus $26,055 for females. The per capita income for the city was $20,038. About 2.9% of families and 4.2% of the population were below the poverty line, including 3.6% of those under age 18 and 8.6% of those age 65 or over.

Parks and recreation
The city has two large parks located at each end of the city. Mound park, located on the west, includes sand volleyball courts, a gazebo, shelters, tennis court, playground equipment, and a rollerskating rink which is operational during the summer months. Memorial Park, on the east, contains playground equipment, much open space for flying kites, letting dogs run, a nine-hole disc golf course, and a basketball area.

In 2009, the  paved north loop of the Raccoon River Valley Trail (RRVT) added Dallas Center, Minburn, Perry, Dawson and Jamaica as new trailheads. The original Raccoon River Valley Trail, now known as the south loop, is a  paved multi-use recreational trail which reaches from the Clive Greenbelt Trail to Jefferson, and passes through Clive, Urbandale, Waukee, Adel, Redfield, Linden, Panora, Yale, Herndon, and Cooper. The shaded trailhead in Dallas Center is at 14th and Walnut and has seasonal restroom facilities, a water fountain, bicycle racks, several benches, and a picnic table.

Government
The mayor is Danny Beyer. Members of the city council are Ryan Kluss, Ryan Coon, and Amy Strutt.

Education
The city of Dallas Center is joined with the city of Grimes to make the school district of Dallas Center–Grimes Community School District. The district consists of a middle school (5-6 grades), Dallas Center Elementary School (K-4) in Dallas Center, and the South Prairie Elementary (K–4), North Ridge Elementary (K-4), Oak View (grades 7-8), Heritage Elementary (K-4), and Dallas Center-Grimes High School + Administration Office in front of DC-G High School which are all in Grimes. The school mascot is the Mustangs and their colors are red and white.

See also
 Raccoon River Valley Trail

References

External links

Cities in Iowa
Cities in Dallas County, Iowa
Des Moines metropolitan area
1869 establishments in Iowa
Populated places established in 1869